The 2008 Women's One-Day Internationals Asia Cup was the fourth edition of the ACC Women's Asia Cup, a Women's One Day International cricket tournament organized by the Asian Cricket Council. Four teams took part in the tournament: Bangladesh, India, Pakistan and Sri Lanka. Matches involving Bangladesh did not have ODI status. It was held between 2 May and 11 May 2008, in Sri Lanka. The matches were played at the Welagedara Stadium and Rangiri Dambulla International Stadium.
India won the final against Sri Lanka by 177 runs.

Tournament structure
Each side played each other two in the group stages. The top 2 teams based on points at the end of the group stages met each other in a one-off final. Each win yielded 4 points while a tie/no result yielded 2 points and Bonus yielded 1-point.

Squads

Group stage table

Match summary

 India Women won the toss and elected to bat.

 Pakistan Women won the toss and elected to field.

 Pakistan Women won the toss and elected to bat.

 India Women won the toss and elected to bat.
 Seema Pujare and Priyanka Roy (Ind) made their ODI debuts.

 India Women won the toss and elected to bat.
 Gouher Sultana (Ind) made her ODI debut.

 Bangladesh won the toss and elected to bat.

 Bangladesh won the toss and elected to bat. 

 Sri Lanka won the toss and elected to field.
 Javeria Khan (Pak) made her ODI debut.

 Pakistan won the toss and elected to bat.

 Sri Lanka won the toss and elected to bat.

 India won the toss and elected to bat.
 Anagha Deshpande and Snehal Pradhan (Ind) made their ODI debuts.

 Sri Lanka won the toss and elected to field.

Final

 India won the toss and elected to bat.

References

External links
 Cricinfo tournament page

2008
International cricket competitions in 2008
2008 in Indian cricket
2008 in Sri Lankan cricket
2008 in Bangladeshi cricket
2008 in Pakistani cricket
International women's cricket competitions in Sri Lanka
2008 in women's cricket
May 2008 sports events in Asia